Selawik (Iñupiaq: Siiḷivik or Akuliġaq) is a city in Northwest Arctic Borough, Alaska, United States. At the 2010 census the population was 829, up from 772 in 2000.

Geography
Selawik is located at  (66.597043, -160.013674).

Selawik is near the Selawik National Wildlife Refuge, a breeding and resting area for migratory waterfowl.

Demographics

Selawik first appeared on the 1880 U.S. Census as the unincorporated Inuit village of "Selawigamute." All 100 residents were Inuit. It did not appear again on the census until 1920, that time as Selawik. It has appeared on every successive census to date. It formally incorporated in 1963.

As of the census of 2000, there were 772 people, 172 households, and 147 families residing in the city. The racial makeup of the city was 3.24% White, 0.13% Black or African American, 94.82% Native American, 0.78% Asian, 0.13% Pacific Islander, and 0.91% from two or more races.  0.13% of the population were Hispanic or Latino of any race.

There were 172 households, out of which 68.6% had children under the age of 18 living with them, 41.9% were married couples living together, 29.1% had a female householder with no husband present, and 14.5% were non-families. 12.8% of all households were made up of individuals, and 1.2% had someone living alone who was 65 years of age or older.  The average household size was 4.49 and the average family size was 4.78.

In the city, the age distribution of the population shows 48.1% under the age of 18, 12.7% from 18 to 24, 23.1% from 25 to 44, 10.6% from 45 to 64, and 5.6% who were 65 years of age or older.  The median age was 19 years. For every 100 females, there were 108.1 males.  For every 100 females age 18 and over, there were 116.8 males.

The median income for a household in the city was $25,625, and the median income for a family was $27,639. Males had a median income of $50,278 versus $40,417 for females. The per capita income for the city was $8,170.  About 34.6% of families and 34.4% of the population were below the poverty line, including 36.2% of those under age 18 and 22.7% of those age 65 or over.

History 
A Lt. Lavrenty Zagoskin of the Imperial Russian Navy first reported the village in the 1840s as "Chilivik."  In his census study in 1880, Ivan Petrof counted 100 "Selawigamute" people.

Around 1908, the village site had a small wooden schoolhouse and church.  The village now has expanded across the Selawik River onto three banks, linked by bridges.

Education
The Davis-Ramoth Memorial School, operated by the Northwest Arctic Borough School District, serves the community.  it had about 270 students, with Alaska Natives making up the majority.

References

Cities in Alaska
Cities in Northwest Arctic Borough, Alaska
Populated places of the Arctic United States